Suzanne Proulx is a Canadian politician. She was a Parti Québécois member of the National Assembly of Quebec for the riding of Sainte-Rose from 2012 to 2014, first elected in the 2012 election.

References

Living people
Parti Québécois MNAs
Women MNAs in Quebec
21st-century Canadian politicians
21st-century Canadian women politicians
Year of birth missing (living people)